The Paris Choral Society (or PCS) is an auditioned amateur choir based at the American Cathedral in Paris, France.

The PCS is incorporated as a voluntary association under French law as an Association loi de 1901, and is made up of 100 singers of different nationalities dedicated to the performance of choral masterpieces. Three concerts are performed every season accompanied by professional orchestras and soloists.

History 
Founded in 1994 by a group of non-professional singers under the direction of Edward J. Tipton, the PCS quickly became known for its high standard of performance and its annual Sing-along of Handel’s Messiah which has been held every December since the inception of the choir. The current Music Director is Zachary Ullery.

In recent years, the Paris Choral Society has performed
Orff's Carmina Burana (June 2017),
Mozart's Great Mass in C Minor (2016), Handel's Dixit Dominus and Coronation Anthems (November 2015), Beethoven's Missa Solemnis in the Church of Saint-Eustache (March 2015),
Fauré's Requiem and Bernstein's Chichester Psalms (November 2014),
Rachmaninoff's Vespers (March 2017), Bach's B Minor Mass (April 2014), Brahms A German Requiem, Haydn's The Creation (2013), Mozart's Requiem (2011, 2018), Bach's St. John Passion (2012), Morten Lauridsen's Lux Aeterna (2011), Mendelssohn's Elijah  (2010), and Rossini's Petite Messe Solonelle (2011).

References 

Choral societies
Musical groups established in 1994
1994 establishments in France
French choirs